Sanicula odorata, commonly called the clustered blacksnakeroot, is a flowering plant in the family Apiaceae. It is native and widespread in eastern North America.  It grows in nutrient-rich woods, often in mesic forests and bottomlands. It is able to tolerate somewhat degraded habitats, and is not considered a particularly conservative species.

It flowers in the late spring and early summer.

Identification
Identification of this species from other Sanicula in eastern North America can be difficult. The following combination of features separate it: leaves are divided into 5 (usually) to 7 (occasionally) leaflets; styles are much longer than the calyx; there are up to 12-25 stamens per umbellet; flowers and anthers are yellowish-green, with petals much longer than sepals.

References

External links
  USDA PLANTS Database:  http://plants.usda.gov/core/profile?symbol=SAOD

odorata
Flora of Eastern Canada
Flora of the Eastern United States